Catocala consors, the consort underwing, is a moth of the family Erebidae. It is found from Maine and Connecticut south to Florida and west to Texas and eastern Oklahoma.

The wingspan is over 70 mm. Adults are on wing from April to July depending on the location. There is one generation per year.

The larvae feed on Amorpha fructicosa and Carya species.

Subspecies
Catocala consors consors
Catocala consors sorsconi Barnes & Benjamin, 1924 (Maine)

References

External links
Species info

Moths described in 1797
consors
Moths of North America